General Sir Edwin Logie Morris,  (10 March 1889 – 29 June 1970) was a senior British Army officer who served during the First World War and later the Second World War, where he became Chief of the General Staff, India from February 1942 to April 1944.

Military career
Educated at Wellington College, Berkshire, Morris entered the Royal Military Academy, Woolwich and was commissioned as a second lieutenant into the Royal Engineers in 1909. He served in the First World War, where he was awarded the Military Cross and was mentioned in despatches.

Morris was a student at the Staff College, Camberley from 1921 to 1922, becoming an instructor there between 1926 and 1930. He was then appointed a General Staff Officer (GSO) at the War Office in 1931. He attended the Imperial Defence College in 1933 and, from 1934, was deputy director of Military Operations & Intelligence for India. From 1936 he was deputy director of Military Operations at the War Office. In 1939 he was appointed a brigadier on the staff of Northern Command.

At the outbreak of the Second World War, Morris was Director of Staff Duties at the War Office. He was appointed General Officer Commanding (GOC) West Sussex County Division in 1940 and GOC 1st Infantry Division in 1941. Later in 1941 he became GOC IX Corps and in 1942 he was appointed Chief of the General Staff in India. In 1944 he was appointed General Officer Commanding-in-Chief (GOC-in-C) for Northern Command.

After the war, in 1946, Morris was appointed Head of the Army Representative Military Staff Committee in the United Nations, a post he held until he retired in 1948. He was also aide-de-camp general to King George VI from 1947 to 1948. From 1951 to 1958 he was the Chief Royal Engineer.

References

Bibliography

External links
British Army Officers 1939−1945
Generals of World War II

|-
 

|-
 

|-
 

|-

1889 births
1970 deaths
British Army generals
Graduates of the Royal College of Defence Studies
British Army generals of World War II
British Army personnel of World War I
Graduates of the Royal Military Academy, Woolwich
Graduates of the Staff College, Camberley
Knights Commander of the Order of the Bath
Officers of the Order of the British Empire
People educated at Wellington College, Berkshire
People from Greenwich
Recipients of the Military Cross
Royal Engineers officers
War Office personnel in World War II
Academics of the Staff College, Camberley
Military personnel from London